Dai is the pinyin romanization of the Chinese surname written with the Chinese character . It is romanized as Tai in Wade-Giles and in Hong Kong Government Cantonese Romanisation. Dai is the 96th most common surname in China, according to a report on the household registrations released by the Chinese Ministry of Public Security on April 24, 2007.

Meanings of the character
 Apply items to the person's head, face, neck, hand, etc.
 Respect, esteem, or support.

Notable people

Business
 Dai Chunning (戴春宁, born 1962), Chinese finance businessman
 Dai Min (戴敏, born 1958), Chinese water treatment businesswoman
 Weili Dai (戴伟立), Chinese-born American technology businesswoman
Andrew Tai (戴浩原), Canadian-Chinese businessman, Founder & CEO of Unhaggle and Motoinsight

Academia and literature
 Dai Yi (戴逸, born 1926), Chinese historian
 Dai Qing (戴晴, born 1941), Chinese journalist
 Dai Sijie (戴思杰, born 1954), Chinese-born French author and filmmaker
 Dai Jinhua (戴锦华, born 1959), Chinese feminist cultural critic
 Dai Xu (戴旭, born 1964), Chinese author, social commentator, and the president of Marine Institute For Security And Cooperation
 Hongjie Dai (戴宏杰, born 1966), Chinese-born American chemist

Entertainment
 Aaron Dai (戴海清, born 1967), American composer and pianist
 Leon Dai (戴立忍, born 1966), Taiwanese actor and film director
 Penny Tai (戴佩妮, born 1978), Malaysian Mandopop singer
 Dai Jiaoqian (戴娇倩, born 1982), Chinese actress
 Dantes Dailiang (戴亮, born 1978), French Mandopop singer

Politics and government
 Dai Jitao (戴季陶, 1891–1949), journalist and Kuomintang leader
 Dai Li (also Tai Li; 戴笠, 1897–1946), Republic of China spy chief
 Dai Bingguo (戴秉国, born 1941), Chinese politician and diplomat
 Dai Xianglong (戴相龙, born 1944), Chinese politician, former governor of the People's Bank of China
 Tai Chin-wah (戴展華, born 1952), Hong Kong former politician and lawyer
 Benny Tai (戴耀廷, One of the founders of the Occupy Central
 Dai Weimin (戴维民, born 1962), People's Liberation Army general
 Day Guey-ing (戴桂英), Deputy Minister of Department of Health of the Republic of China (2012–2013)
 Irving H.C. Tai (戴豪君), Taiwan politician, former Deputy Commissioner of the Research, Development and Evaluation Commission
 Tai Cheuk-yin (戴卓賢), Hong Kong politician, former chairman of the 123 Democratic Alliance

Sport
 Tai Chao-chih (戴兆智, born 1930), Taiwanese sport shooter
 Dai Guohong (戴国红, born 1977), Chinese swimmer
 Dai Yun (戴韫, born 1977), retired Chinese female badminton player
 Dai Xianrong (戴宪荣, born 1982), China League One footballer
 Dai Lili (戴丽丽, born 1986), Chinese table tennis player
 Dai Lin (戴琳, born 1987), Chinese Super League footballer
 Tai Hung-hsu (戴宏旭, born 1987), Taiwanese football striker
 Dai Xiaoxiang (戴小祥, born 1990), Chinese archer
 Dai Jun (swimmer) (戴骏, born 1992), Chinese swimmer
 Tai Tzu-ying (戴資穎, born 1992), Taiwanese badminton player
 Olivia Tai Qing Tong (戴辛彤, born ), Malaysian rhythmic gymnast

Other

 Wei Dai (戴维), creator of the Bitcoin predecessor "b-money" and developer of the Crypto++ library

See also
 Yūki Tai, of unrelated Japanese surname Tai

References

Chinese-language surnames
Individual Chinese surnames